DNA photolyase, N-terminal is an evolutionary conserved protein domain. This domain binds a light harvesting chromophore that enhanced the spectrum of photolyase or cryptochrome light absorption, i.e. an antenna. It adopts the rossmann fold.

The cofactor may be either the pterin 5,10-Methenyltetrahydrofolate (MTHF) in folate photolyases or the deazaflavin 8-hydroxy-7,8-didemethyl-5-deazariboflavin (8-HDF) in deazaflavin photolyases. The 8-HDF ligand usually binds into this domain (next to the C-terinal half), while MHF tends to bind to an outside groove of this domain. A structural signature for 8-HDF binding has been produced, highlighting amino acid residues that determine which antenna a photolyase can use. Experiments on a Thermus thermophilus protein with this domain shows that artificial substrates can be alternatively used for a modified absorption spectra. It naturally binds FMN in a pose similar to 8-HDF. In addition, many cryptochromes, especially those from animals, bind no cofactors at this domain.

Even though few eukaryotes (and no animals) can synthesize 8-HDF on their own, many lineages nevertheless use deazaflavin photolyases. They probably receive 8-HDF from their endosymbiotic microbes. Unlike many bacterial deazaflavin photolyases that accepts FMN as well as 8-HDF, one such enzyme from the fruit fly only accepts 8-HDF.

The FeS-BCP N-terminal domain is homologous to this domain. Instead of an organic cofactor, its chromophore is an iron-sulphur cluster.

Examples 
Human proteins containing this domain include:
 CRY1
 CRY2

References 

Protein domains